"I'm Waking Up to Us" is a song by Belle & Sebastian, released as a single/EP on Jeepster in 2001. The track saw the band work with another producer besides usual collaborator Tony Doogan for the first time: Mike Hurst, former member of the Springfields and producer of Petula Clark and Cat Stevens.

The front cover features band member Sarah Martin and a beagle. All three tracks from the single were later collected on the Push Barman to Open Old Wounds compilation. The single reached number 39 on the UK Singles Chart and number 50 in Sweden. It was ranked number 73 in Pitchfork Media's "The Top 100 Singles of 2000–04".

Reception
PopMatters said the song, "ushers in a certain level of maturity for Belle and Sebastian, both musically and thematically speaking, as if the group had come through to the other side of their daydreams and realized they weren’t always all they were cracked up to be. With rich strings and bold semi-orchestral elements like flute and harpsichord, the song found Belle and Sebastian playing with greater panache and spirit."

Track listing
 "I'm Waking Up to Us" – 3:51
 "I Love My Car" – 5:14
 "Marx and Engels" – 3:44

Charts

References

External links
 "I'm Waking Up to Us" at belleandsebastian.com
 "I'm Waking Up to Us" at jeepster.co.uk

Belle and Sebastian songs
2001 singles
2001 songs
Jeepster Records singles
Song recordings produced by Mike Hurst (producer)